Digital Designs, or DD Audio is an American manufacturer of high-end consumer audio products. They produce home and mobile audio products, serving the sound quality and sound pressure categories of the mobile audio market. Nearly all of their products are handmade in the United States. Digital Designs was established in 1986 in Southern California, but moved to Oklahoma City in 1991.

Notable products
9500 Series  These subwoofers are Digital Designs' highest end 3 inch voicecoil ceramic magnet model, and were voted one of the top 10 most badass subwoofers by car audio magazine
Z Series The Z Series line of subwoofers are unique in that they use a 13 lens neodymium motor architecture, which allows for higher motor force than available in any ceramic magnet subwoofer, and has been used successfully in many 180DB+ sound pressure competition vehicles.

References

External links
 Official website

Audio equipment manufacturers of the United States
Companies established in 1986
Companies based in Oklahoma City
1986 establishments in California
1991 establishments in Oklahoma